Christopher Reed North  (born January 26, 1951) is an American musician. He is the founding keyboardist of the American progressive rock band Ambrosia.

Career 

North was born in San Francisco.  He grew up in San Pedro, California, playing in various bands through junior high and high school. Some of the early bands he played with were The Proones, The Livin End, and Thee Exceptions. In 1968 he formed the psychedelic rock band Blue Toad Flax with Tom Trefethen playing organ and singing lead vocals.

In 1970 he formed the progressive rock band Ambrosia with David Pack, Joe Puerta and Burleigh Drummond. He is known for his very intense live performances.

North and the other members of Ambrosia contributed to the album Tales of Mystery and Imagination by The Alan Parsons Project.

He played organ and piano on the hit songs "Galilee" and "Rock 'N' Roll Preacher" from the debut album by Chuck Girard and also on Girard's 1980 album The Stand. North played organ on the John Lennon tribute single "Johnny's Gone Away" written and produced by Tom Trefethen with Alan Parsons as executive producer.

In 2014 North played on the song "The Soft Parade" from Light My Fire: A Classic Rock Salute to The Doors.

North is listed on the All Time Hammond Pops list three times for his solos on Ambrosia hits “Holdin' on to Yesterday”, “Biggest Part of Me” and “You're the Only Woman (You & I)”. He was also listed from 1976-1981 as one of the top multi-keyboardists by Keyboard Magazine at which time they discontinued the list.

Discography

Live Albums with Ambrosia

Compilation Albums with Ambrosia

Singles with Ambrosia

References

External links 
 Ambrosia - Official Website
 Ambrosia - Official Facebook Page
 https://web.archive.org/web/20110203021946/http://christophernorthmusic.com/

Ambrosia (band) members
1951 births
Living people
20th-century American keyboardists
20th-century American male musicians
21st-century American keyboardists
21st-century American male musicians
21st-century organists
American male organists
American organists
Musicians from San Francisco
Progressive rock keyboardists